The electoral district of Mount Waverley was an electoral district of the Victorian Legislative Assembly. It was located in the south-eastern suburbs of Melbourne and contained the suburbs of Glen Waverley and Mount Waverley.

The seat was created prior to the 2002 election replacing the normally safe Liberal seat of Glen Waverley. When created, Mount Waverley had a notional Liberal margin of 9.1% but it was won by Labor's Maxine Morand at the 2002 election in a swing of 11.4%. It was one of four seats won by Labor on Green preferences after trailing the Liberals on the primary vote results. Liberal candidate Michael Gidley won the seat at the 2010 state election with a swing of 7.4%. Gidley held the seat until being defeated by Labor's Matt Fregon at the 2018 state election.

The seat was abolished by the Electoral Boundaries Commission ahead of the 2022 election and split into the electoral districts of Glen Waverley and Ashwood.

Members for Mount Waverley

Election results

References

External links
 Electorate profile: Mount Waverley, Victorian Electoral Commission

2002 establishments in Australia
Former electoral districts of Victoria (Australia)
2022 disestablishments in Australia